Thiruvalluvar Arts and Science College, is a general degree college located in Kurinjipadi, Tamil Nadu. It was established in the year 1997. The college is affiliated with Thiruvalluvar University. This college offers different courses in arts, commerce and science.

Departments

Science

Physics
Chemistry
Mathematics
Biochemistry
Microbiology
Information Technology
Computer Science

Arts and Commerce

Tamil
English
Business Administration
Commerce

Accreditation
The college is  recognized by the University Grants Commission (UGC).

References

External links

Educational institutions established in 1997
1997 establishments in Tamil Nadu
Colleges affiliated to Thiruvalluvar University
Academic institutions formerly affiliated with the University of Madras